Pier Paolo Campi (1668 – 1764) was an Italian Baroque sculptor.
  
He worked in Rome for studio of Pierre Le Gros the Younger since 1703. His early works include:  the Glory of the Angels, stucco, on the altar of San Salvatore in Lauro in Rome, St. Bonaventure - statue on the balustrade of the colonnade of St. Peter's Square in Vatican and marble sculpture of St. Sebastian for one of the altars of church Sant'Agnese in Piazza Navona, Rome.

In 1712, thanks to recommendation of Pierre Le Gros, he received first commission from Benedictine monastery in Monte Cassino. He worked on commissions from the abbey for next 23 years.  The cooperation resulted in nine monumental sculptures of popes and abbey patrons. Most of those sculptures were destroyed during World War II; only the sculpture of St. Benedict partially survived.
   
Two of his late works can be seen in St. Peter's Basilica in Rome: St. Giulliana Falconieri (1732) and St. Pietro Nolasco (1742).

References

  

Italian Baroque sculptors
Italian male sculptors
1668 births
1764 deaths